Artur Akopyan ( born September 28, 1961) is an Armenian-American gymnastics coach for the USA Gymnastics National Team and a former gymnast on the USSR Olympic Gymnastics Team. He is credited as the first athlete to do a Tsukahara double twist. Akopyan received three scores of 10 at the 1981 World Championships in Moscow. His competitive career included the 1983 World vault title, in addition to three other World individual medals.

Coaching career
Akopyan previously coached 2012 Olympic champion McKayla Maroney. His past national team members include Mattie Larson and Samantha Shapiro. He served as a member of the national team coaching staff from 1989 to 2004. He coaches at All Olympia Gymnastics Center in Los Angeles, California. Akopyan gained recognition in the United States after Bela Karolyi asked him to help gymnast Kim Zmeskal. Within a couple of days, Akopyan was able to help Zmeskal with elements of her compulsory routine that she had been working on for a year.

Competitive history

References

1961 births
Living people
Soviet male artistic gymnasts
World champion gymnasts
Medalists at the World Artistic Gymnastics Championships
Gymnastics coaches
Sportspeople from Yerevan
Universiade medalists in gymnastics
Universiade silver medalists for the Soviet Union
Universiade bronze medalists for the Soviet Union